Gulzar Colony is a neighbourhood in the Korangi District in eastern Karachi, Pakistan. It was previously part of Korangi Town, which was an administrative unit that was disbanded in 2011.

Factories
 National Refinery Limited

References

External links 
 Karachi Website .

Neighbourhoods of Karachi
Korangi Town